Habtamu is an Ethiopian male given name. Its meaning in Amharic can be translated as "my wealth".

Notable people with the name include:

Habtamu Fikadu (born 1988), Ethiopian long-distance runner
Habtamu Wondimu, Ethiopian academic

See also: notable people with Habtamu as the name of the father include 

Atsede Habtamu (born 1987), Ethiopian long-distance runner

See also: variants of the name 

 Habte, variation of the name
 Habtom, variation of the name

References 

Ethiopian given names